Paralaoma compar, also known as the ribbed pinhead snail, is a species of land snail that is endemic to Australia's Lord Howe Island in the Tasman Sea.

Description
The depressedly turbinate shell of the mature snail is 1.2–1.3 mm in height, with a diameter of 2.4–2.5 mm, and a low spire. It is deep golden-brown in colour. The whorls are rounded, with impressed sutures and moderately closely spaced radial ribs. It has a roundedly lunate aperture and moderately widely open umbilicus.

Distribution and habitat
The snail is found on the summits and slopes of the southern mountains of the island.

References

 
 

 
compar
Gastropods of Lord Howe Island
Taxa named by Tom Iredale
Gastropods described in 1944